The Van Halen 2015 Tour was the final concert tour by American hard rock band Van Halen in support of the group's live album, Tokyo Dome Live in Concert, recorded during the band's previous tour. The band toured the United States and Canada during the summer and fall of 2015. It is the final tour the band performed prior to the death of Eddie Van Halen in 2020.

History
On March 24, 2015, the official Van Halen website was updated to announce a concert tour to take place during the summer and fall of 2015, primarily in outdoor venues. The band also announced that they would be performing on television for the first time, with performances on Jimmy Kimmel Live! on March 30, and on The Ellen DeGeneres Show on April 2.

The Kenny Wayne Shepherd Band served as the opening act for all dates except for the September 19 show in Atlanta, Georgia.

The tour ultimately grossed $26 million, covering 39 cities and 41 shows.

Setlist
"Light Up the Sky"
"Runnin' with the Devil"
"Romeo Delight"
"Everybody Wants Some!!"
"Drop Dead Legs"
"Feel Your Love Tonight"
"Somebody Get Me a Doctor"
"She's the Woman"
"China Town" (removed from the setlist after the Pelham date)
"I'll Wait"
Alex Van Halen drum solo ["Drumstruck"]
"Little Guitars"
"Dance the Night Away"
"Beautiful Girls"
"Women in Love..."
"Hot for Teacher"
"In a Simple Rhyme" and "Growth" (removed from the setlist after the Dallas date)
"Dirty Movies"
"Ice Cream Man"
"Unchained"
"Ain't Talkin' 'Bout Love"
Eddie Van Halen guitar solo [featuring "Little Guitars," "Mean Street" (intros), "Spanish Fly," "Cathedral" and "Eruption"]
"You Really Got Me"
"Panama"
"Jump"

Wolfgang Van Halen revealed some of the tour's setlist on Twitter on July 2, 2015. The full setlist was revealed three days later at the first performance on the tour, at White River Amphitheater in Auburn, Washington. Throughout the tour, the setlist featured songs that had not been played in concert in over three decades, and others that had never been played live before.

Tour dates

Gross
Total Gross: $26 million
Total Attendance: 376,538
Shows: 39

Personnel
David Lee Roth – lead vocals
Eddie Van Halen – guitar, backing vocals
Wolfgang Van Halen – bass, backing vocals
Alex Van Halen – drums, percussion

References

External links
 Van-Halen.com – The official Van Halen website
 Van Halen NewsDesk

Van Halen concert tours
2015 concert tours